Eagle Wing is a card game.

Eagle Wing, Eagle's Wing or Eagles Wing may refer to:

 the wing of an eagle
 Eagle's Wing, a 1979 film
 Eagles Wing Corporation, an American aircraft manufacturer
 436th Airlift Wing, nickname Eagle Wing, a unit of the United States Air Force

See also
 Wings of Eagles (disambiguation)
 On the Wings of an Eagle (disambiguation)